Fin (also Romanized as Fīn) is a city and capital of the Fin District of Bandar Abbas County, Hormozgan Province, Iran. At the 2006 census, its population was 3,532, in 860 families.

2021 Earthquake
On Nov 14th 2021, Fin experienced a major doublet earthquake.

References

See also

Kookherd
Bastak
Bandar Lengeh
Hormozgān

Populated places in Bandar Abbas County
Cities in Hormozgan Province